SM U-83 was a Type U 81 U-boat of the German Imperial Navy during the First World War. She had been commissioned and deployed to operate off the coast of the British Isles and attack coastal shipping as part of the German U-boat campaign.

In a six-month career, U-83 made two combat patrols into the South-Western Approaches during the Atlantic campaign. There were just 2 survivors, picked up by Farnborough; 35 of her crew perished. Farnborough was commanded by the submarine hunter Gordon Campbell and had on board later Victoria Cross recipients Ronald Niel Stuart and William Williams.

Design
German Type U 81 submarines were preceded by the shorter Type UE I submarines. U-83 had a displacement of  when at the surface and  while submerged. The submarine was powered by two  engines for use while surfaced, and two  engines for use while submerged. She had two propeller shafts.

U-83 was fitted with four  torpedo tubes (two at the bow and two at the stern), twelve to sixteen torpedoes, and one  SK L/45 deck gun. She had a complement of thirty-five (thirty-one crew members and four officers).

Summary of raiding history

References

Notes

Citations

Bibliography

World War I submarines of Germany
German Type U 81 submarines
Ships built in Kiel
1916 ships
U-boats commissioned in 1916
Maritime incidents in 1917
U-boats sunk in 1917
U-boats sunk by British warships
World War I shipwrecks in the Atlantic Ocean
Shipwrecks of Ireland
Ships lost with all hands